The Nepal national women's cricket team represents Nepal in international women's cricket. They made their international debut in the ACC Women's Tournament in Malaysia in July 2007. Nepal has been participating in various international tournaments since then. Nepal's current captain is Rubina Chhetry, coach is Shyam Sun Jung Thapa and manager is Sanjaya Raj Singh.

In April 2018, the International Cricket Council (ICC) granted full Women's Twenty20 International (WT20I) status to all its members. Therefore, all Twenty20 matches played between Nepal women and another international side after 1 July 2018 will be a full WT20I.  Nepal made her Twenty20 International debut on 12 January 2019 against China, at the 2019 Thailand Women's T20 Smash in Bangkok. Nepal finished runner-up at the tournament losing to Thailand by 70 runs in the Final.

Overview
Women's cricket is thriving and the national team (made up of top athletes from other sports) did very well to reach the final of the 2007 ACC Women's Tournament. Nepal won the 2008 ACC Under-19 Women's Championship and defended its title in 2010.

In the ACC Women Twenty20 in Malaysia in 2009, Singapore needed two runs off the last over for victory with five wickets intact. Rubina Chhetry was given the 'hopeless' over but she did a miracle by taking five wickets in five balls as the match ended in a draw as she threw a wide. Nepal won the match in bowl-out. With the rare incident, Rubina also became the first Nepalese cricketer, man or woman, to take a hat-trick. "I have never heard that any team has won the match taking five wickets in the last over, this is very, very rare," the then captain Binod Das commented.

On 26 April 2018, ICC announced that all the T20 matches played between ICC members will be awarded T20I status starting from 1 July 2018 for women's cricket, as a result Nepal played their first T20I match against China on January 12 2019.

In December 2020, the ICC announced the qualification pathway for the 2023 ICC Women's T20 World Cup. Nepal were named in the 2021 ICC Women's T20 World Cup Asia Qualifier regional group, alongside seven other teams.

Current squad
The following is a list of players who were in the squad for 2022 ACC Women's T20 Championship or were centrally contracted by the Cricket Association of Nepal for 2023.

Coaching staff

Tournament history

ICC Women's T20 World Cup Asia Qualifier
 2016: 2nd (DNQ)
 2017: 3rd (DNQ)
 2019: 2nd (DNQ)
 2021: 3rd (DNQ)

Asia Cup

Asian Games

ACC Women's Tournament

South Asian Games

Honours

Others
South Asian Games
 Bronze Medal (1): 2019

Records and Statistics

International Match Summary — Nepal Women
 
Last updated 24 June 2022

Twenty20 International 
 Highest team total: 164/3 v. Qatar on 18 November 2021 at West End Park International Cricket Stadium, Doha.
 Highest individual score: 82*, Sita Rana Magar v Qatar on 18 November 2021 at West End Park International Cricket Stadium, Doha.
 Best innings bowling: 6/0, Anjali Chand v Maldives, 2 December 2019 at Pokhara Rangasala, Pokhara.

Most T20I runs for Nepal Women

Most T20I wickets for Nepal Women

T20I record versus other nations

Records complete to WT20I #1146. Last updated 24 June 2022.

See also
 List of Nepal women Twenty20 International cricketers

References

Cricket teams in Nepal
Cricket, women's
Women's national cricket teams
Women
Women's sport in Nepal
2007 establishments in Nepal